Musa Mohammed Mayieko (born 6 June 1991) is a Kenyan international footballer who plays for Nkana, as a centre back.

Club career
Born in Nairobi, Mohammed began his career at Gor Mahia, serving as captain. With Gor Mahia he won the Kenyan Premier League four times, as well as the Kenyan Super Cup.

He signed a two-year contract with Albanian club KF Tirana, but the contract was terminated in April 2018 after four months, after he failed to adapt to Europe. Mohammed claims he terminated the contract due to "several issues, some personal, some monetary".

In July 2018 he signed a two-year contract with Zambian club Nkana.

International career
Mohammed made his international debut for Kenya in 2011. He captained the national team to victory at the 2017 Cecafa Senior Challenge Cup.

References

1991 births
Living people
Sportspeople from Nairobi
Kenyan footballers
Association football defenders
Gor Mahia F.C. players
KF Tirana players
Nkana F.C. players
Kenyan Premier League players
Kategoria Superiore players
Kenya international footballers
2019 Africa Cup of Nations players
Kenyan expatriate footballers
Kenyan expatriate sportspeople in Albania
Kenyan expatriate sportspeople in Zambia
Expatriate footballers in Albania
Expatriate footballers in Zambia